Afraciura zernyi is a species of tephritid or fruit flies in the genus Afraciura of the family Tephritidae.

Distribution
Tanzania, Kenya.

References

Tephritinae
Insects described in 1941
Diptera of Africa